The Ophaboom Theatre Company, founded in 1991 by Geoff Beale and Howard Gayton, is an English physical theatre company specializing in creating and performing contemporary works in the Italian Commedia dell'Arte tradition. Drawing on Medieval theatre and the origins of Commedia, Ophaboom set out with the self-stated aim of creating "a popular (and politically topical) style of theatre that would resonate with a modern audience, in the manner of Medieval strolling players." Although the troupe performs in traditional theatre spaces, they also set up their trestle stage on street corners, in village halls, in bowling alleys and many other less conventional venues, with the stated intention of "bringing theatre to audiences who might not otherwise go to see it." 

Although nominally based in London, Ophaboom--like Commedia companies of old--is primarily a touring company. With the aid of Arts Council England, they tour extensively throughout the British Isles; they also regularly tour across continental Europe, performing in seven languages. They were the first English company to appear at the Medieval Festival in Le Puy–en–Velay, and have been invited four times to bring their English brand of Commedia to the Carnival of Venice. They have also toured as far afield as North America and Korea. 

As a leading company in the development of English Commedia, Ophaboom was profiled in the book Commedia dell'Arte: A Handbook for Troupes by John Rudlin and Olly Crick (Routledge Publisher, London and New York, 2001). Rudlin and Crick examined the company's history, evolution, and working methods, placing their work in context alongside European Commedia masters such as Carlo Boso and Antonio Fava. Ophaboom's contributions to English Commedia have been further documented in New Theatre Quarterly 67, edited by Clive Barker and Simon Trussler (Cambridge University Press, 2001); Shakespeare Survey 50 edited by Stanley Wells (Cambridge University Press, 2002), and Faust: Icon of Modern Culture by Osman Durrani (Helms Information Ltd., UK, 2004).

Current members of the company: Geoff Beale, Howard Gayton, Sarah Ratheram, and Claire Jones.

External links 
Ophaboom Theatre Company
Ophaboom MySpace page 
BBC article on Ophaboom's Faust
British Theatre Guide on the World Premier of Ophaboom's Burke and Hare

Commedia dell'arte
Performing groups established in 1991
1991 establishments in England